Wednesbury bus station is a bus interchange in the town of Wednesbury, in the West Midlands region of England.It is managed by Transport for West Midlands. Local bus services operated by various bus companies serve the bus station which has 12 departure stands. Wednesbury Great Western Street tram stop on the West Midlands Metro is a short walk away.

The rebuilt bus station opened in October 2004 as part of a major regeneration of the south side of Wednesbury town centre, which was completed three years later when a new Morrisons supermarket opened adjacent to the bus station.

External links
A map/plan of the bus station and town centre locating each bus stand
Wednesbury Bus Station - Geograph.org.uk

Bus stations in the West Midlands (county)
Transport infrastructure completed in 2004
West Bromwich
2004 establishments in England